Tellina gaimardi, the angled wedge shell, is a bivalve mollusc of the family Tellinidae.

References
 Powell A W B, New Zealand Mollusca, William Collins Publishers Ltd, Auckland, New Zealand 1979 
 Glen Pownall, New Zealand Shells and Shellfish, Seven Seas Publishing Pty Ltd, Wellington, New Zealand 1979 

Tellinidae
Bivalves of New Zealand
Molluscs described in 1915